Kurt-Werner Brändle (19 January 1912 – 3 November 1943) was a German Luftwaffe military aviator during World War II, a fighter ace credited with 180 enemy aircraft shot down in over 700 combat missions. The majority of his victories were claimed over the Eastern Front, with 25 claims over the Western Front. He was "ace-in-a-day" three times, shooting down five or more aircraft on a single day.

Born in Ludwigsburg, Brändle, who already was a civilian motor-powered aircraft and glider pilot, volunteered for military service in the Luftwaffe of Nazy Germany in 1935. He was posted to Jagdgeschwader 53 (JG 53—53rd Fighter Wing) in 1939 and claimed 14 aerial victories on the Western Front. In May 1942 he was given command of II. Gruppe (2nd group) of Jagdgeschwader 3 "Udet" (JG 3—3rd Fighter Wing). Fighting on the Eastern Front, he was awarded the Knight's Cross of the Iron Cross on 1 July 1942 after 49 aerial victories. In July and August 1942, he claimed a further 50 aerial victories in the southern sector of the Eastern Front. After claiming his 100th aerial victory he was awarded the Knight's Cross of the Iron Cross with Oak Leaves on 27 August 1942.

On 5 July 1943 during the Battle of Kursk, Brändle achieved his 150th aerial victory and in August 1943 was transferred to the Western Front fighting in Defense of the Reich. There Brändle was killed in action on 3 November 1943 west of Amsterdam in the Netherlands. His body was washed ashore near Zandvoort on 30 December 1943.

Early life and career
Brändle was born on 19 January 1912 in Ludwigsburg in the Kingdom of Württemberg, a federated state of the German Empire. His father was a Meister, a master craftsman, in the field of precision mechanics. Following school, Brändle learned the trade of a surgical instrument maker and worked in his father's firm.

Since his early youth he was very enthusiastic about flying and volunteered for military service in the Luftwaffe of the Third Reich on 10 December 1935. There he participated in a number of exercises and was promoted to Leutnant (second lieutenant) of the Reserves on 1 December 1936. In his civilian life, Brändle attained a pilot license and worked as a flight instructor. As an instructor, he trained roughly 150 students and logged more than 6,000 starts and 8,000 flight hours before he became a military aviator. In addition to his passion for motor power flight, he also was a glider pilot.

In early 1937 Brändle passed his Meister examination in aircraft construction and in the same year was trained as a fighter pilot with Jagdgeschwader 134 "Horst Wessel" (JG 134—134th Fighter Wing), named after the martyr of the Nazi movement Horst Wessel. As of 1 February 1939, Brändle served with Flieger-Ausbildungs-Regiment 22 (22nd Flight Training Regiment) in Güstrow. There, he transferred from the reserve force to active service and was promoted to Oberleutnant (first lieutenant) on 1 June 1939. He was then transferred to the 4. Staffel (4th Squadron) of Jagdgeschwader 53 (JG 53—53rd Fighter Wing).

World War II
World War II in Europe began on Friday 1 September 1939 when German forces invaded Poland. Brändle received the Iron Cross 2nd Class on 20 April 1940. He claimed his first aerial victory on 10 May 1940 during the Battle of France, shooting down an Armée de l'Air (French Air Force) Morane-Saulnier M.S.406 south of Sedan. In total Brändle claimed two victories over France before he was wounded on 26 May 1940. During takeoff on a maintenance test flight he crashed into a Dornier Do 17 injuring himself in the head. He spent the next few weeks in the military hospital at Heidelberg.

After recovering from the hospital, Brändle claimed his second victory during the Battle of Britain over the Royal Air Force (RAF) on 11 August 1940. On 26 August 1940, he was tasked with the leadership of 5. Staffel (5th Squadron) of JG 53. Following his fourth aerial victory, he was awarded the Iron Cross 1st Class on 3 September 1940. He was officially appointed Staffelkapitän (squadron leader) of 5. Staffel on 15 September 1940. On 11 November 1940, he claimed his 6th and 7th aerial victories and was awarded the Front Flying Clasp of the Luftwaffe for Fighter Pilots in Silver on 5 May 1941 and in Gold on 7 June 1941.

The bulk of the Geschwaders air elements were moved via Jever, in northern Germany, to Mannheim-Sandhofen on 8 June 1941. There the aircraft were given a maintenance overhaul prior to moving east. The II. Gruppe was transferred to Neusiedel in East Prussia, present-day Malomožaiskojė in Kaliningrad Oblast in Russia, between 12–14 June. On 22 June the Geschwader crossed into Soviet airspace in support of Operation Barbarossa, the invasion of the Soviet Union which opened the Eastern Front. There, Brändle claimed further victories and by the end of October 1941 was credited with 28 aerial victories.

Brändle's unit was then relocated to the Western Front again in October 1941 where it was based at Leeuwarden in the Netherlands before it was moved to the Mediterranean theater in December 1941. Based at Comiso airfield, Brändle flew combat missions against the RAF during the siege of Malta. There he was awarded the German Cross in Gold on 25 February 1942 and four days later, on 1 March, he was promoted to Hauptmann (captain).

Group commander
On 1 May 1942, Brändle was appointed Gruppenkommandeur (group commander) of II. Gruppe of Jagdgeschwader 3 "Udet" (JG 3—3rd Fighter Wing), named after the World War I fighter ace Ernst Udet. Its former Gruppenkommandeur, Hauptmann Karl-Heinz Krahl, had been killed in action over Malta on 14 April 1942. At the time, the Gruppe was stationed at Plzeň for rest and refit before it was relocated to the Eastern Front on 18 May 1942. Too late to participate in the Battle of the Kerch Peninsula, it was located on the left wing of Army Group South, assigned to an airfield at Chuguyev in the Kharkov area. Brändle scored the Gruppes first victory after the relocation, claiming a Polikarpov R-5 reconnaissance bomber aircraft at 3:49 am on 20 May 1942. By this date, Brändle had accumulated 36 victories. He was awarded the Knight's Cross of the Iron Cross on 1 July 1942 for 49 aerial victories. On this day, he claimed his 53rd aerial victory, after he shot down an Ilyushin Il-2 "Sturmovik".

Brändle often claimed multiple victories per day, three victories on 8 July 1942 took his tally to 58 and further three claims made on 10 July took his score to 61. On 16 July 1942 he filed four claims, numbers 64–67. He became an "ace-in-a-day" for the first time on 26 July 1942 when he shot down five enemy aircraft, aerial victories 73–77, and again five on 7 August 1942, 89 in total.

In July and August 1942, he claimed 50 aerial victories in the southern sector of the Eastern Front, among them his 100th to 102nd victory on 23 August 1942. He was the 17th Luftwaffe pilot to achieve the century mark. For this achievement he was awarded the Knight's Cross of the Iron Cross with Oak Leaves on 27 August 1942, the 114th officer or soldier of the Wehrmacht so honored. The presentation was made by Adolf Hitler personally.

Brändle was promoted to Major on 1 March 1943. On 29 April 1943, he claimed his 135th to 138th aerial victories. On 5 July 1943, the first day of the Battle of Kursk, he claimed five victories taking his total to 151. His II. Gruppe claimed 77 aircraft shot down on 12 July which included its 2,000 aerial victory of the war.

Defense of the Reich and death
In early August 1943, Brändle's II. Gruppe was withdrawn from the Eastern Front for service in Defense of the Reich on the Western Front. The Gruppe spent one-month training in northern Germany before they arrived at the Schiphol airfield near Amsterdam in the Netherlands on 12 September.

On 3 November 1943, Brändle shot down two Republic P-47 Thunderbolts fighters escorting a formation of Boeing B-17 Flying Fortresses on a mission targeting Wilhelmshaven. Later that day, he was killed in action west of Amsterdam in the Netherlands. Following an attack by a group of Martin B-26 Marauders on Schiphol airfield, II. Gruppe scrambled to counter the attack. It is assumed that he was shot down in his Messerschmitt Bf 109 G-6 (Werknummer 26058—factory number) by Royal Canadian Air Force (RCAF) fighters under the command of Wing Commander Lloyd Chadburn. His body was later washed ashore near Zandvoort on 30 December 1943 and was buried at the Heroes Cemetery in Amsterdam (field 74, grave 405) one day later. His remains were moved in January 1944 before they were reinterred for a last time on 2 December 1947, this time at the cemetery Ysselsteyn (block CW, row 1, grave 25).

Summary of career

Aerial victory claims
According to US historian David T. Zabecki, Brändle was credited with 180 aerial victories. Mathews and Foreman, authors of Luftwaffe Aces — Biographies and Victory Claims, researched the German Federal Archives and found records for 170 aerial victory claims, plus five further unconfirmed claims. This number includes 16 aerial victory claims on the Western Front, and 154 Soviet Air Forces piloted aircraft on the Eastern Front.

Victory claims were logged to a map-reference (PQ = Planquadrat), for example "PQ 18274". These sectors were then subdivided into 36 smaller units to give a location area 3 × 4 km in size.

Awards
 Iron Cross (1939)
 2nd Class (20 April 1940)
 1st Class (3 September 1940)
 Front Flying Clasp of the Luftwaffe for Fighter Pilots
 in Silver (5 May 1941)
 in Gold (7 June 1941)
 German Cross in Gold on 25 February 1942 as Oberleutnant in the 5./Jagdgeschwader 53
 Knight's Cross of the Iron Cross with Oak Leaves
 Knight's Cross on 1 July 1942 as Hauptmann and Gruppenkommandeur of the II./Jagdgeschwader 3 "Udet"
 114th Oak Leaves on 27 August 1942 as Hauptmann and Gruppenkommandeur of the II./Jagdgeschwader 3 "Udet"

Notes

References

Citations

Bibliography

 
 
 
 
 
 
 
 
 
 
 
 
 
 
 
 
 
 
 
 
 

1912 births
1943 deaths
People from Ludwigsburg
German World War II flying aces
Luftwaffe pilots
Luftwaffe personnel killed in World War II
Recipients of the Gold German Cross
Recipients of the Knight's Cross of the Iron Cross with Oak Leaves
Burials at Ysselsteyn German war cemetery
Military personnel from Baden-Württemberg
Aviators killed by being shot down